ChangesNowBowie is an album composed of material recorded in live sessions in 1996 by English musician David Bowie. Initially released for streaming on 17 April 2020, the album also had a limited release for Record Store Day, 29 August 2020, as both an LP and CD. The album contains a set of recordings initially recorded for a BBC broadcast for Bowie's 50th birthday.

Background

The recordings which became ChangesNowBowie were initially recorded in 1996, in preparation for a BBC broadcast. At the time, Bowie was preparing for his 50th birthday concert, which would be celebrated on 9 January 1997, at Madison Square Garden, New York, and it is from these rehearsals that the recordings were made. The show took place a day after Bowie's fiftieth birthday, featuring a number of guests such as the Foo Fighters, Sonic Youth, and Lou Reed.

The songs were initially broadcast, between segments of interviews not present on the release, on BBC Radio 1 on 8 January 1997, Bowie's birthday. ChangesNowBowie marks the first official release of these recordings.

Recording

The recordings took place at Looking Glass Studios, New York, in 1996, and are mostly acoustic recordings of Bowie songs, with the exceptions of "White Light/White Heat" by The Velvet Underground and "Shopping For Girls" by Bowie's band, Tin Machine. Accompanying Bowie were Gail Ann Dorsey, Mark Plati, and Reeves Gabrels, all of whom spent a significant amount of time working with Bowie across his career. Both Plati and Gabrels, along with Bowie, acted as producers of the tracks.

Track listing

Vinyl release

CD release

Personnel
 David Bowie – vocals, producer
 Gail Ann Dorsey – bass, vocals
 Reeves Gabrels – guitar, producer
 Mark Plati – recorded, mixed, producer, keyboards
 Ray Staff – mastered

References

External links

 ChangesNowBowie at Discogs

David Bowie live albums
2020 albums